"Danke Deutschland" is a song by Croatian singer Sanja Trumbić, dedicated to Germany for its role in Croatia's gaining of independence.

The lyrics, in German:

Danke Deutschland, meine Seele brennt!
Danke Deutschland, für das liebe Geschenk.
Danke Deutschland, vielen Dank,
wir sind jetzt nicht allein,
und die Hoffnung kommt in das zerstörte Heim.

Translation:

Thank you Germany, my soul is burning!
Thank you Germany, for the lovely gift.
Thank you Germany, many many thanks,
now we are alone no longer,
and hope comes into our destroyed homeland.

References 

1992 songs
Croatian songs
German-language songs